Burn is the self-titled, debut release of the American hardcore band Burn, released in 1990 on Revelation Records.

Track listing
 "Shall Be Judged"
 "Godhead"
 "Drown"
 "Out of Time"

References 

1990 EPs
Albums produced by Don Fury